Proxys victor is a species of stink bug in the family Pentatomidae. It is found in South America, Central America, and North America.

References

External links

 

Carpocorini
Insects described in 1775
Taxa named by Johan Christian Fabricius